Thathi Bhai is a village in Tehsil Bagha Purana, District Moga in Punjab, India.

Location
Thathi Bhai  lies in-between  small towns Kotkapura and Bagha Purana. It acts as merging point for bus routes from Kotkapura, Moga (via Bagha Purana) and Bathinda (via Bargari or Bhagta Bhai ka).

Thathi Bhai  is located at the Moga-Bathinda and Moga-Faridkot district border-line, so it is distanced about same from Moga and Bathinda i.e. 32  km and 45  km respectively. Thathi Bhai falls under Bagha Purana tehsil.

Thathi Bhai resides in Tehsil Bagha Purana and comes under 'Halka' Bagha Purana during elections as well, and Darshan Singh is current MLA from halka Bagha Purana.

Religion and Caste

Former name of this village was ' Thathi Kapoor Wali ' because the village was founded by Shaheed Kapoor Singh Gill . He belonged to Majhbi Sikh(Gill) family. For the purpose of multiplying the population of the village, they invited other castes like as Jatt-Sikhs, Mahjans, Mistari, Chimba Sikhs, chumar and few others to live in Thathi Bhai. The lands for living and agriculture were divided by Majhbi Sikh Gills i.e. the founder families .  The village has a Founders memorial place for Kapoor Singh Gill, which is situated on Dera Sahib road. 
 
Total population of village as recorded in 2010 is about Five Thousand . By religion, Village demographics is largely dominated by Sikh population.

About Village

The Village has 3 Government schools (1 Government Senior Secondary School and 2 Government Primary Schools) and a Private public school named Guru Nanak Public School, Gurdwara Sahib, Vishvkarma Temple and Dera sahib,  Civil Medical hospital and a Civil Veterinary dispensary, drug stores, youth clubs for development of village, Nestle Dairy station/center, a petrol pump. Although Agriculture is main profession for people to earn for their lives, a number of people are Government employees working as Teachers and Policemen etc.

Recently a public library named Manav Chetna Library has been installed above Namdev Bhavan (ਨਾਮਦੇਵ ਭਵਨ).
Apart from that village has two dharmshala's (Inn), one main dharmshala and other Kingra JattSikh's dharmshala, one panchayat bhawan. 

Mrs. sukhdeep kaur is the present day Sarpanch of the Village.

Sports and Other activities
         
Village has its own sports club that includes a playground and gym. The most commonly played games are cricket, volleyball and kabaddi. Thathi Bhai also has a cricket club, the Thathi Bhai cricket club, a volleyball team and kabaddi team. Every year at occasion of Vaisakhi, village hosts a Volleyball tournament in which teams from villages nearby are invited to compete .

Teams from the village have participated in State Level Science Congress held in Chandigarh on multiple occasions.

Bhagwan Singh Gill, an athlete from the village, recently made national news after winning bronze medal (rowing) in the Asian Games.

References

Moga, Punjab
Villages in Moga district